Events in the year 1896 in Bulgaria.

Incumbents

Events 

 29 November – Parliamentary elections were held in the country. The elections were marred by disturbances, particularly in Sofia. The elections were won by the ruling party (the People's Party) led by Prime Minister Konstantin Stoilov.

References 

 
1890s in Bulgaria
Years of the 20th century in Bulgaria
Bulgaria
Bulgaria